Kanpur Junction (also known as Kanpur Purana) was a former station in Kanpur on the Kanpur–Allahabad line opened in 1859 and closed after the opening of , the present station.

History
After the first passenger train service was inaugurated between Bombay and Thane, this was the fourth railway line in India opened from Allahabad to Kanpur (180 km) on 3 March 1859, which was the first passenger railway line in North India. This was followed in 1889 by the Delhi–Ambala–Kalka line.

References

Railway stations in Kanpur
Railway junction stations in India
Railway stations in India opened in 1859
Allahabad railway division
Defunct railway stations in India